Woodrow Wilson Crumbo (January 21, 1912—April 4, 1989) (Potawatomi) was an artist, Native American flute player, and dancer who lived and worked mostly in the West of the United States. A transcript of his daughter's interview shows that Mr. Crumbo was born on January 31, 1912, so there is a discrepancy of the date until confirmation. As an independent prospector in New Mexico in the late 1950s, he found one of the largest beryllium veins in the nation, valued at millions of dollars.  

His paintings are held by several major museums, including the Smithsonian Institution and the Metropolitan Museum of Art, with a large collection at the Thomas Gilcrease Institute in Tulsa, Oklahoma. Crumbo was a 1978 inductee into the Oklahoma Hall of Fame for his paintings. He was appointed as an "ambassador of good will" for Oklahoma in 1982 by Governor George Nigh.

Early life
Born near Lexington, Oklahoma, Crumbo moved with his mother to Kansas as a child after the death of his father in 1916.  Orphaned in 1919, he spent the rest of his childhood living with various American Indian families around Sand Springs, Oklahoma.  When Crumbo was 17, he began studying art at the Chilocco Indian Agricultural School, also taking up the study of the Kiowa ceremonial wooden flute. Later he soloed on this instrument in performance with the Wichita Symphony.

At the age of 19, Crumbo earned a scholarship to the Wichita American Indian Institute. He graduated three years later as valedictorian. Crumbo continued his studies at Wichita University from 1933 to 1936, where he studied mural technique with Olle Nordmark, watercolor with Clayton Staples, and painting and drawing with Oscar Jacobson. In 1936 Crumbo enrolled at the University of Oklahoma, where he studied for two years with Oscar Jacobson.

Professional career

While studying art, Crumbo supported himself as a Native American dancer.  He toured reservations across the United States in the early 1930s disseminating and collecting traditional dances. 

His art career was affirmed when Susie Peters, his mentor from his days at the Chilocco Indian School sold a number of his paintings to the San Francisco Museum of Art. Subsequently, Crumbo joined the Bacone College in Muskogee as Director of Art from 1938-1941, succeeding Acee Blue Eagle.  

In 1939, the U. S. Department of the Interior, which includes the Bureau of Indian Affairs as one of its constituent agencies, commissioned him to paint murals on the walls of its building in Washington D. C. A few years later he curated a collection of Native American art at the Thomas Gilcrease Institute in Tulsa. Crumbo's "peyote bird" design became the logo for the Gilcrease Museum.

He was commissioned to paint two murals in the U.S.S. Oklahoma, which were both destroyed when the battleship was attacked and sunk at Pearl Harbor.

From 1948 to 1960, Crumbo lived in Taos, New Mexico. He exhibited at numerous shows and became more widely known both nationally and internationally because he adapted some of his work to techniques of engraving and printing, making multiple originals.

In the 1950s, Crumbo bought a $3 mail-order mineral identification kit; he took up prospecting with fellow artist Max Evans. The two found deposits of ore worth millions, including a vein of beryllium that the New Mexico School of Mines identified at the time as "among the greatest beryllium finds in the nation." Crumbo became "a major stockholder in Taos Uranium and Exploration Corp. that was formed by a group of Texas investors to develop the claims" for beryllium and copper.

With his first interest as art, Crumbo served as Assistant Director of the El Paso, Texas Museum of Art from 1960–1967 and briefly as Director in 1968.  

He left to work independently at art and explore humanitarian efforts. He aided the Isleta Pueblo Indians of New Mexico to gain federal recognition and donated money to help the Potawatomi build a cultural heritage center near Shawnee. In 1973 he took up residence near Checotah, Oklahoma, where he continued to create and to promote Native American art.  In 1978, he was inducted into the Oklahoma Hall of Fame. 

Crumbo's work was part of Stretching the Canvas: Eight Decades of Native Painting (2019–2021), a survey at the National Museum of the American Indian George Gustav Heye Center.

Death 
He moved to Cimarron, New Mexico in 1988, and died there in 1989. His body was returned for burial in Okmulgee, Oklahoma.

References

External links
"Land of Enchantment" (1946), one of Crumbo's best-known paintings .
Woody Crumbo art, Smithsonian Institution Research Information System
Voices of Oklahoma interview with Minisa Crumbo Halsey. First person interview conducted on November 11, 2014, with Minisa Crumbo Halsey, daughter of Woody Crumbo.

University of Oklahoma alumni
Native American painters
Citizen Potawatomi Nation people
American prospectors
Artists from Oklahoma
Bacone College faculty
1912 births
1989 deaths
People from Lexington, Oklahoma
People from Checotah, Oklahoma